The Battle of Adwa (also spelled Adowa) was the climactic battle of the First Italo-Ethiopian War. The Ethiopian forces defeated the Italian invading force on Sunday 1 March 1896, near the town of Adwa. The decisive victory thwarted the campaign of the Kingdom of Italy to expand its colonial empire in the Horn of Africa. By the end of the 19th century, European powers had carved up almost all of Africa after the Berlin Conference; only Ethiopia and Liberia still maintained their independence. Adwa became a pre-eminent symbol of pan-Africanism and secured Ethiopian sovereignty until the Second Italo-Ethiopian War forty years later.

Background
In 1889, the Italians signed the Treaty of Wuchale with the then King Menelik of Shewa. The treaty, signed after the Italian occupation of Eritrea, recognized Italy's claim over the coastal colony. In it, Italy also promised to provide financial assistance and military supplies. A dispute later arose over the interpretation of the two versions of the document. The Italian-language version of the disputed Article 17 of the treaty stated that the Emperor of Ethiopia was obliged to conduct all foreign affairs through Italian authorities, effectively making Ethiopia a protectorate of the Kingdom of Italy. The Amharic version of the article, however, stated that the Emperor could use the good offices of the Kingdom of Italy in his relations with foreign nations if he wished. However, the Italian diplomats claimed that the original Amharic text included the clause and that Menelik II knowingly signed a modified copy of the Treaty.

The Italian government decided on a military solution to force Ethiopia to abide by the Italian version of the treaty. As a result, Italy and Ethiopia came into confrontation, in what was later to be known as the First Italo-Ethiopian War. In December 1894, Bahta Hagos led a rebellion against the Italians in Akele Guzai, in what was then Italian controlled Eritrea. Units of General Oreste Baratieri's army under Major Pietro Toselli crushed the rebellion and killed Bahta. The Italian army then occupied the Tigrayan capital, Adwa. In January 1895, Baratieri's army went on to defeat Ras Mengesha Yohannes in the Battle of Coatit, forcing Mengesha to retreat further south.

By late 1895, Italian forces had advanced deep into Ethiopian territory. On 7 December 1895, Ras Makonnen Wolde Mikael, Fitawrari Gebeyehu and Ras Mengesha Yohannes commanding a larger Ethiopian group of Menelik's vanguard annihilated a small Italian unit at the Battle of Amba Alagi. The Italians were then forced to withdraw to more defensible positions in Tigray Province, where the two main armies faced each other. By late February 1896, supplies on both sides were running low. General Oreste Baratieri, commander of the Italian forces, knew the Ethiopian forces had been living off the land, and once the supplies of the local peasants were exhausted, Emperor Menelik II's army would begin to melt away. However, the Italian government insisted that General Baratieri act.

On the evening of 29 February, Baratieri, about to be replaced by a new governor, General Baldissera, met with his generals Matteo Albertone, Giuseppe Arimondi, Vittorio Dabormida, and Giuseppe Ellena, concerning their next steps. He opened the meeting on a negative note, revealing to his brigadiers that provisions would be exhausted in less than five days, and suggested retreating, perhaps as far back as Asmara. His subordinates argued forcefully for an attack, insisting that to retreat at this point would only worsen the poor morale. Dabormida exclaimed, "Italy would prefer the loss of two or three thousand men to a dishonorable retreat." Baratieri delayed making a decision for a few more hours, claiming that he needed to wait for some last-minute intelligence, but in the end announced that the attack would start the next morning at 9:00am. His troops began their march to their starting positions shortly after midnight.

Order of battle

Ethiopian forces

 Shewa; Negus Negasti Menelik II: 25,000 rifles / 3,000 horses / 32 guns
 Begemder; Itaghiè Taytu: 9,000 rifles / 600 horses / 4 guns
 Gojjam; Negus Tekle Haymanot: 8,000 rifles / 700 horses
 Harar; Ras Makonnen: 15,000 rifles
 Tigray; Ras Mengesha Yohannes and Ras Alula: 12,000 rifles / 6 guns
 Wollo; Ras Mikael: 6,000 rifles / 5,000 horses
 Semien; Ras Gugsa Olié: 8,000 rifles
 Lasta; Wagshum Guangul: 6,000 rifles
 In addition there were ~20,000 spearmen and swordsmen as well as an unknown number of armed peasants.

Estimates for the Ethiopian forces under Menelik range from a low of 73,000 to a high of over 100,000 outnumbering the Italians by an estimated five times. The forces were divided among Emperor Menelik, Empress Taytu Betul, Ras Wale Betul, Ras Mengesha Atikem, Ras Mengesha Yohannes, Ras Alula Engida (Abba Nega), Ras Mikael of Wollo, Ras Makonnen Wolde Mikael,Fitawrari Habte Giyorgis, Fitawrari Gebeyyehu, and Negus Tekle Haymanot Tessemma. In addition, the armies were followed by a similar number of camp followers who supplied the army, as had been done for centuries. Most of the army consisted of riflemen, a significant percentage of whom were in Menelik's reserve; however, there were also a significant number of cavalry and infantry only armed with lances (those with lances were referred to as "lancer servants"). The Kuban Cossack army officer N. S. Leontiev who visited Ethiopia in 1895, according to some sources, led a small team of Russian advisers and volunteers. Other sources assert that Leontiev did not in fact participate in the battle, rather he visited Ethiopia first unofficially in January 1895, and then officially as a representative of Russia in August 1895, but then left later that year, returning only after the Battle of Adwa.

Ethnic composition of the Ethiopian army

At the Battle of Adwa, Ethiopian fighters from all parts of the country rallied to the cause and took up positions on the battlefield that allowed them to come to each other's aid during combat. Armies who participated in the battle includes Tekle Haymanot's Amhara infantry and cavalry; Ras Mengesha’s Tigrayan army; Ras Mikael’s Oromo cavalry; Ras Makonnen's Harar army that composed of Amhara and Gurage infantry and Oromo cavalry; Wag-shum Gwangul's Agew and Amhara infantry from Wag and Lasta. Fitawrari Tekle led the Wellega Oromo cavalry while Ras Gugsa Olié's army was composed of Amharas from Semien and Quara. Empress Taytu Bitul led her own Begemder Amhara and Yejju fighters. The Fitawrari's army, normally the leader of the advanced guard, was commanded by Fitawrari Gebeyehu. The mehal sefari or central fighting unit mostly included Shewan Amhara infantry and Mecha-Tulama Oromo cavalry. The Ethiopian army at Adwa was, therefore, a mosaic of various ethnic groups and tribes that marched north for a common, national cause.

Italian forces

The Italian army consisted of four brigades, totaling 17,978 troops with fifty-six artillery pieces. However, it is likely that fewer fought in the actual battle on the Italian side: Harold Marcus notes that "several thousand" soldiers were needed in support roles and to guard the lines of communication to the rear. He accordingly estimates that the Italian force at Adwa consisted of 14,923 effective combat troops. One brigade under General Albertone was made up of Eritrean Ascari led by Italian officers. The remaining three brigades were Italian units under Brigadiers Dabormida, Ellena and Arimondi. While these included elite Bersaglieri and Alpini units, a large proportion of the troops were inexperienced conscripts recently drafted from metropolitan regiments in Italy into newly formed "d'Africa" battalions for service in Africa. Additionally, a limited number of troops were from the Cacciatori d'Africa; units permanently serving in Africa and in part recruited from Italian settlers.

According to historian Chris Prouty:

The Italian operational corps in Eritrea was under the command of General Oreste Baratieri. The chief of staff was Lieutenant Colonel Giacchino Valenzano.

Right column: (4,833 rifles / 18 cannons) 2nd Infantry Brigade (Gen. Vittorio Dabormida);
 3rd Africa Infantry Regiment, (Col. Ottavio Ragni)
 5th Africa Infantry Battalion (Maj. Luigi Giordano)
 6th Africa Infantry Battalion (Maj. Leopoldo Prato)
 10th Africa Infantry Battalion (Maj. Gennaro De Fonseca)
 6th Africa Infantry Regiment (Col. Cesare Airaghi)
 3rd Africa Infantry Battalion (Maj. Luigi Branchi)
 13th Africa Infantry Battalion (Maj. Alberto Rayneri)
 14th Africa Infantry Battalion (Maj. Secondo Solaro)
 Native Mobile Militia Battalion (Maj. Lodovico De Vito)
 Native Company from the Asmara Chitet (Cpt. Alberto Sermasi)
 2nd Artillery Brigade (Maj. Alberto Zola)
 5th Mountain Artillery Battery (Cpt. Giuseppe Mottino)
 6th Mountain Artillery Battery (Cpt. Giuseppe Regazzi)
 7th Mountain Artillery Battery (Cpt. Vittorio Gisla)
Central column: (3,324 rifles / 12 cannons) 1st Infantry Brigade (Gen. Giuseppe Arimondi);
 1st Africa Bersaglieri Regiment (Col. Francesco Stevani)
 1st Africa Bersaglieri Battalion (Maj. Matteo De Stefano)
 2nd Africa Bersaglieri Battalion (Maj. Lorenzo Compiano)
 1st Africa Infantry Regiment (Col. Ugo Brusati)
 2nd Africa Infantry Battalion (Maj. Flaciano Viancini)
 4th Africa Infantry Battalion (Maj. Luigi De Amicis)
 9th Africa Infantry Battalion (Maj. Giuseppe Baudoin)
 1st Company of the 5th Native Battalion (Cpt. Pietro Pavesi)
 8th Mountain Artillery Battery (Cpt. Vincenzo Loffredo)
 11th Mountain Artillery Battery (Cpt. Giocanni Franzini)
Left column: (4,339 rifles / 14 cannons) Native Brigade (Gen. Matteo Albertone);
 1st Native Battalion (Maj. Domenico Turitto)
 6th Native Battalion (Maj. Giuseppe Cossu)
 5th Native Battalion (Maj. Rodolfo Valli)
 8th Native Battalion (Maj. Giocanni Gamerra)
 "Okulè Kusai" Native Irregular Company (Lt. Alessandro Sapelli)
 1st Artillery Brigade (Maj. Francesco De Rosa)
 1st Native Mountain Artillery Battery (Cpt. Clemente Henry)
 2nd Section of the 2nd Native Mountain Artillery Battery (Lt. Arnaldo Vibi)
 3rd Mountain Artillery Battery (Cpt. Edoardo Bianchini)
 4th Mountain Artillery Battery (Cpt. Umberto Masotto)
Reserve column: (3,032 rifles /12 cannons) 3rd Infantry Brigade (Gen. Giuseppe Ellena);
 4th Africa Infantry Regiment (Col. Giovanni Romero)
 7th Africa Infantry Battalion (Maj. Alberto Montecchi)
 8th Africa Infantry Battalion (Maj. Achille Violante)
 11th Africa Infantry Battalion (Maj. Sebastiano Manfredi)
 12th Africa Infantry Battalion (Maj. Rinaldo Amatucci)
 5th Africa Infantry Regiment (Col. Luigi Nava)
 15th Africa Infantry Battalion (Maj. Achille Ferraro)
 16th Africa Infantry Battalion (Maj. Bugenio Vandiol)
 1st Africa Alpini Battalion (Lt. Col. Davide Menini)
 3rd Native Battalion (Lt. Col. Giuseppe Galliano)
 1st Quick Fire Artillery Battery (Cpt. Giovanni Aragno)
 2nd Quick Fire Artillery Battery (Cpt. Domencio Mangia)
Sappers company

Budget restrictions and supply shortages meant that many of the rifles and artillery pieces issued to the Italian reinforcements sent to Africa were obsolete models, while clothing and other equipment was often substandard. The logistics and training of the recently arrived conscript contingents from Italy were inferior to the experienced colonial troops based in Eritrea.

Battle
On the night of 29 February and the early morning of 1 March,  three Italian brigades advanced separately towards Adwa over narrow mountain tracks, while a fourth remained camped. David Levering Lewis states that the Italian battle plan: However, the three leading Italian brigades had become separated during their overnight march and by dawn were spread across several miles of very difficult terrain. Their sketchy maps caused Albertone to mistake one mountain for Kidane Meret, and when a scout pointed out his mistake, Albertone advanced directly into the Ethiopian positions.

Unbeknownst to General Baratieri, Emperor Menelik knew his troops had exhausted the ability of the local peasants to support them and had planned to break camp the next day (2 March). The Emperor had risen early to begin prayers for divine guidance when spies from Ras Alula, brought him news that the Italians were advancing. The Emperor summoned the separate armies of his nobles and with the Empress Taytu Betul beside him, ordered his forces forward. Negus Tekle Haymanot commanded the right wing with his troops from Gojjam, Ras Mengesha in the left with his troops from Tigray, Ras Makonnen leading the center with his Harari troops, and Ras Mikael at the north side leading the Wollo Oromo cavalry. In the reserves on the hills just west of Adwa, were the Emperor Menelik and Empress Taitu, with the warriors of Ras Olié and Wagshum Guangul. The Ethiopian forces positioned themselves on the hills overlooking the Adwa valley, in perfect position to receive the Italians, who were exposed and vulnerable to crossfire.

Albertone's Ascari Brigade was the first to encounter the onrush of Ethiopians at 06:00, near Kidane Meret, where the Ethiopians had managed to set up their mountain artillery. Accounts of the Ethiopian artillery deployed at Adwa differ; Russian advisor Leonid Artamonov wrote that it comprised forty-two Russian mountain guns supported by a team of fifteen advisers, but British writers suggest that the Ethiopian guns were Hotchkiss and Maxim pieces captured from the Egyptians or purchased from French and other European suppliers. The Ethiopian units closest to Albertone’s advanced position on the slopes of the Hill of Enda Kidane Meret first moved to the attack. These included troops under Ras Mangasha, Negus Tekle Haymanot, and Ras Makonnen while those of Wagshum Guangul and Ras Olié came up soon after, so a large proportion of the Ethiopian army was soon concentrated against Albertone’s isolated Ascari Brigade. Albertone's heavily outnumbered Ascaris held their position for two hours until Albertone's capture, and under Ethiopian pressure the survivors sought refuge with Arimondi's brigade. Arimondi's brigade beat back the Ethiopians who repeatedly charged the Italian position for three hours with gradually fading strength until Menelik released his reserve of 25,000 Shewans and overran the Italian defenders. Two companies of Bersaglieri who arrived at the same moment could not help and were cut down.

Dabormida's Italian Brigade had moved to support Albertone but was unable to reach him in time. Cut off from the remainder of the Italian army, Dabormida began a fighting retreat towards friendly positions. However, he inadvertently marched his command into a narrow valley where the Wollo Oromo cavalry under Ras Mikael slaughtered his brigade, while shouting Ebalgume! Ebalgume! ("Reap! Reap!"). Dabormida's remains were never found, although an old woman living in the area said that she had given water to a mortally wounded Italian officer, "a chief, a great man with spectacles and a watch, and golden stars".

General Baratieri, realizing that the battle was lost, ordered a general retreat. He tried to get the last uncommitted units of the Italian reserve column led by General Ellena to cover the retreat. But before they could form up, their lines were broken by a flood of fleeing Italian soldiers. The reserve had no chance to form a coherent defence, and soon the Gojjam forces under the command of Tekle Haymanot was able to immediately rout Ellena’s Italian Brigade. The Italian army was now completely broken and the main battle was over. The  Ethiopian cavalry from Gojjam, Shewa and Wollo then pushed forward and pursued the fleeing Italians relentlessly, as Berkeley records from eyewitness accounts, “the Abyssinians wild with enthusiasm then rushed in upon them, reckless of losses and death.” General Arimondi was cut down and killed by the Ethiopian cavalry during this retreat. The Ethiopian pursuit continued for nine miles until the late afternoon, while local peasants alerted by signal fires killed Italian and Ascari stragglers throughout the night.

Immediate aftermath

The losses of the Italian army were 
6,133 killed and 1,428 wounded in the battle and subsequent retreat back into Eritrea, with 1,681 taken prisoner. Brigadiers Dabormida and Arimondi were amongst the dead. Caulk records that Ethiopian losses were 3,886 killed and 6,000 wounded. In their flight to Eritrea, the Italians left behind all of their artillery and 11,000 rifles, as well as most of their transport. As Paul B. Henze notes, "Baratieri's army had been completely annihilated while Menelik's was intact as a fighting force and gained thousands of rifles and a great deal of equipment from the fleeing Italians." The Italian prisoners, who included Brigadier Albertone, appear to have been treated as well as could be expected under difficult circumstances, though about 200 died of their wounds in captivity.

However, 800 captured Eritrean Ascari, regarded as traitors by the Ethiopians, had their right hands and left feet amputated. Augustus Wylde records when he visited the battlefield months after the battle, the pile of severed hands and feet was still visible, "a rotting heap of ghastly remnants." Further, many Ascari had not survived their punishment, Wylde writing how the neighborhood of Adwa "was full of their freshly dead bodies; they had generally crawled to the banks of the streams to quench their thirst, where many of them lingered unattended and exposed to the elements until death put an end to their sufferings." There does not appear to be any evidence for reports that some Italians were castrated and these may reflect confusion with the atrocious treatment of the Ascari prisoners.

Baratieri was relieved of his command and later charged with preparing an "inexcusable" plan of attack and for abandoning his troops in the field. He was acquitted on these charges but was described by the court martial judges as being "entirely unfit" for his command.

Public opinion in Italy was outraged. Chris Prouty offers a panoramic overview of the response in Italy to the news:

The Russian support for Ethiopia led to the advent of a Russian Red Cross mission. The Russian mission was a military mission conceived as a medical support for the Ethiopian troops. It arrived in Addis Ababa some three months after Menelik's Adwa victory.
In 1895, Emperor Menelik II invited Leontiev to return to Ethiopia with a Russian military mission. Leontiev organized a delivery of Russian weapons for Ethiopia: 30,000 rifles, 5,000,000 cartridges, 5,000 sabres, and a few cannons.

Aftermath 

Emperor Menelik decided not to follow up on his victory by attempting to drive the routed Italians out of their colony. The victorious Emperor limited his demands to little more than the abrogation of the Treaty of Wuchale. In the context of the prevailing balance of power, the emperor's crucial goal was to preserve Ethiopian independence. In addition, Ethiopia had just begun to emerge from a long and brutal famine; Harold Marcus reminds us that the army was restive over its long service in the field, short of rations, and the short rains which would bring all travel to a crawl would soon start to fall. At the time, Menelik claimed a shortage of cavalry horses with which to harry the fleeing soldiers. Chris Prouty observes that "a failure of nerve on the part of Menelik has been alleged by both Italian and Ethiopian sources." Lewis believes that it "was his farsighted certainty that total annihilation of Baratieri and a sweep into Eritrea would force the Italian people to turn a bungled colonial war into a national crusade" that stayed his hand.

As a direct result of the battle, Italy signed the Treaty of Addis Ababa, recognizing Ethiopia as an independent state. Almost forty years later, on 3 October 1935, after the League of Nations's weak response to the Abyssinia Crisis, the Italians launched a new military campaign endorsed by Benito Mussolini, the Second Italo-Ethiopian War. This time the Italians employed vastly superior military technology such as tanks and aircraft, as well as chemical warfare, and the Ethiopian forces were defeated by May 1936. Following the war, Italy occupied Ethiopia for five years (1936–41), before eventually being driven out during World War II by British Empire forces and Ethiopian Arbegnoch guerillas.

Significance

"The confrontation between Italy and Ethiopia at Adwa was a fundamental turning point in Ethiopian history," writes Henze. On a similar note, the Ethiopian historian Bahru Zewde observed that "few events in the modern period have brought Ethiopia to the attention of the world as has the victory at Adwa".

The Russian Empire had sold many artillery pieces to the Ethiopian forces and paid enthusiastic compliments to the Ethiopian success. One of the documents of that time stated "The Victory immediately gained the general sympathy of Russian society and it continued to grow." The unique outlook which polyethnic Russia exhibited to Ethiopia disturbed many supporters of European nationalism during the twentieth century. The Russian Cossack captain Nikolay Leontiev with a small escort was present at the battle as an observer.

This defeat of a colonial power and the ensuing recognition of African sovereignty became rallying points for later African nationalists during their struggle for decolonization, as well as activists and leaders of the Pan-African movement. As the Afrocentric scholar Molefe Asante explains,

On the other hand, many writers have pointed out how this battle was a humiliation for the Italian military. Italian historian Tripodi argued that some of the roots of the rise of Fascism in Italy went back to this defeat and to the perceived need to "avenge" the defeat that started to be present in the military and nationalistic groups of the Kingdom of Italy. The same Mussolini declared when Italian troops occupied Addis Ababa in May 1936: Adua è vendicata (Adwa has been avenged).

Indeed, one student of Ethiopia's History, Donald N. Levine, points out that for the Italians Adwa "became a national trauma which demagogic leaders strove to avenge. It also played no little part in motivating Italy's revanchist adventure in 1935". Levine also noted that the victory "gave encouragement to isolationist and conservative strains that were deeply rooted in Ethiopian culture, strengthening the hand of those who would strive to keep Ethiopia from adopting techniques imported from the modern West – resistances with which both Menelik and Ras Teferi/Haile Selassie would have to contend".

Present-day celebrations of Adwa

Public holiday
The Adwa Victory Day is a public holiday in all regional states and charter cities across Ethiopia. All schools, banks, post offices and government offices are closed, with the exceptions of health facilities. Some taxi services and public transports choose not to operate on this day. Shops are normally open but most close earlier than usual.

Public celebrations
The Victory of Adwa, being a public holiday, is commemorated in public spaces. In Addis Ababa, the Victory of Adwa is celebrated at Menelik Square with the presence of government officials, patriots, foreign diplomats and the general public. The Ethiopian Police Orchestra play various patriotic songs as they walk around Menelik Square.

The public dress up in traditional Ethiopian patriotic attire. Men often wear Jodhpurs and various types of vest; they carry the Ethiopian flag and various patriotic banners and placards, as well as traditional Ethiopian shields and swords called Shotel. Women dress up in different patterns of handcrafted traditional Ethiopian clothing, known in Amharic as Habesha kemis. Some wear black gowns over all, while others put royal crowns on their heads. Women's styles of dress, like their male counterparts, imitate the traditional styles of Ethiopian patriotic women. Of particular note is the dominant presence of the Empress Taytu Betul during these celebrations.

The beloved and influential wife of Emperor Menelik II, Empress Taytu Betul, played a significant role during the Battle of Adwa. Although often overlooked, thousands of women participated in the Battle of Adwa. Some were trained as nurses to attend to the wounded, and others mainly cooked and supplied food and water to the soldiers and comforted the wounded.

In addition to Addis Ababa, other major cities in Ethiopia, including Bahir Dar, Debre Markos and the town of Adwa itself, where the battle took place, celebrate the Victory of Adwa in public ceremonies.

Symbols
Several images and symbols are used during the commemoration of the Victory of Adwa, including the tri-coloured green, gold and red Ethiopian flag, images of Emperor Menelik II and Empress Taytu Betul, as well as other prominent kings and war generals of the time including King Tekle Haymanot of Gojjam, King Michael of Wollo, Dejazmach Balcha Safo, Fitawrari Habte Giyorgis Dinagde, and Fitawrari Gebeyehu, among others. Surviving members of the Ethiopian patriotic battalions wear the various medals that they collected for their participation on different battlefields. Young people often wear T-shirts adorned by Emperor Menelik II, Empress Taytu, Emperor Haile Selassie and other notable members of the Ethiopian monarchy. Popular and patriotic songs are often played on amplifiers. Of particular note are Ejigayehu Shibabaw's ballad dedicated to the Battle of Adwa and Teddy Afro's popular song "Tikur Sew", which literally translates to "black man or black person" – a poetic reference to Emperor Menelik II's decisive African victory over Europeans, as well as the Emperor's darker skin complexion.

Film
 Adwa – 1999 Ethiopian documentary directed by Haile Gerima

See also 
Scramble for Africa
Colonisation of Africa

Notes

Footnotes

Citations

References

 Berkeley, G.F.-H. (1902) The Campaign of Adowa and the Rise of Menelik, Westminster: A. Constable, 403 pp., 
 Brown, P.S. and Yirgu, F. (1996) The Battle of Adwa 1896, Chicago: Nyala Publishing, 160 pp., 
 Bulatovich, A.K. (nd) With the Armies of Menelik II: Journal of an Expedition from Ethiopia to Lake Rudolf, translated by Richard Seltzer, 
 Bulatovich, A.K. (2000) Ethiopia Through Russian Eyes: Country in Transition, 1896–1898, translated by Richard Seltzer, Lawrenceville, N.J. : Red Sea Press, 
 Henze, P.B. (2004) Layers of Time: A History of Ethiopia, London: Hurst & Co., 
 Jonas, R.A. (2011) The Battle of Adwa: African Victory in the Age of Empire, Bellknap Press of Harvard University Press, 
 Lewis, D.L. (1988) The Race to Fashoda: European Colonialism and African Resistance in the Scramble for Africa, 1st ed., London: Bloomsbury, 
 Marcus, H.G. (1995) The Life and Times of Menelik II: Ethiopia, 1844–1913, Lawrenceville, N.J.: Red Sea Press, 
 Pankhurst, K.P. (1968) Economic History of Ethiopia, 1800–1935, Addis Ababa: Haile Sellassie I University Press, 772 pp., 
 Pankhurst, K.P. (1998) The Ethiopians: A History, The Peoples of Africa Series, Oxford: Blackwell Publishers, 
 Rosenfeld, C.P. (1986) Empress Taytu and Menelik II: Ethiopia 1883–1910, London: Ravens Educational & Development Services, 
 Uhlig, S. (ed.) (2003) Encyclopaedia Aethiopica, 1 (A–C), Wiesbaden: Harrassowitz, 
 Worrell, R. (2005) Pan-Africanism in Barbados: An Analysis of the Activities of the Major 20th-Century Pan-African Formations in Barbados, Washington, DC: New Academia Publishing, 
 Zewde, Bahru (1991) A History of Modern Ethiopia, 1855–1974, Eastern African Studies series, London: Currey, 
 With the Armies of Menelik II, emperor of Ethiopia at www.samizdat.com

External links

 Historynet: Ethiopia's Decisive Victory at Adowa
 Who Was Count Abai?
 The Colony of Eritrea from its Origins until March 1, 1899 from 1899 which details the Battle of Adwa from the World Digital Library
 Painting depicting the Battle of Adwa, Catalogue No. E261845, Department of Anthropology, NMNH, Smithsonian Institution

Conflicts in 1896
Battles of the First Italo-Ethiopian War
Battle of Adwa
Battle of Adwa
Battles involving Italy
Battles involving Ethiopia
Battles involving Eritrea
History of Eritrea
History of Ethiopia
March 1896 events
Orders of battle